Jeremy Bates and Patrick Baur were the defending champions, but did not participate this year.

Nduka Odizor and Christo van Rensburg won the title, defeating Ronnie Båthman and Rikard Bergh 6–3, 6–4 in the final.

Seeds

  Nduka Odizor /  Christo van Rensburg (champions)
  Tomás Carbonell /  Marcos Aurelio Gorriz (semifinals)
  Wayne Ferreira /  Piet Norval (quarterfinals)
  Ronnie Båthman /  Rikard Bergh (final)

Draw

Draw

External links
Draw

Tel Aviv Open
1990 Riklis Classic